Zakaria ibn Adam Ash'ari Qomi was a Shia Muhaddith (scholar of hadith) from 8th century and one of the companions of Jaʿfar ibn Muḥammad aṣ-Ṣādiq (the sixth Shiite leader). He was one of the narrators (Hadith transmitter) of Musa ibn Ja'far al-Kadhim (the seventh Shiite leader) and the agent of Ali ibn Musa al-Ridha (the eighth Shiite leader) and Muhammad al-Jawad (the ninth Shiite leader) in Qom, Iran.

Genealogy
Zakaria ibn Adam Ash'ari Qomi also known as Abu Yahya is from the "Al-Ashari" family who migrated from Kufa to Qom. His father is Adam ibn Abdullah ibn Sa'd Ash'ari, whom Shaykh Tusi has considered one of the companions of Ja'far al-Sadiq (the sixth Shia Imam). Adam ibn Abdullah has narrated a hadith from Ali al-Ridha (the eighth Shia Imam)  transmitted by his son Zakaria.

His brother Ishaq ibn Adam was one of the narrators of Ali al-Ridha (the eighth Shia Imam) and his cousin Zakaria ibn Idris was also one of the narrators of Ja'far al-Sadiq (the sixth Shia Imam), Musa al-Kadhim (the seventh Shia Imam) and Ali al-Ridha (the eighth Shia Imam).

His position with the Imams

Ja'far al-Sadiq and Musa al-Kadhim
Shaykh Tusi has considered Zakaria ibn Adam Ash'ari Qomi one of the companions of Ja'far al-Sadiq (the sixth Shia Imam). None of the Islam scholar's sources have called him one of the companions of Musa al-Kadhim (the seventh Shia Imam), but he has been mentioned among the narrators (hadith transmitter) of this Imam.

Agent of Ali al-Ridha
Shaykh Tusi has also considered Zakaria ibn Adam Ash'ari Qomi one of the companions of Ali al-Ridha (the eighth Shia Imam). According to some narrations, Ali al-Ridha referred people to Zakaria ibn Adam in religious matters and introduced him as trustworthy in matters of religion and the world. He received the religious funds of the people of Qom as the agent of the Imam. On a Hajj pilgrimage from Medina to Mecca, Zakaria ibn Adam traveled with Ali al-Ridha.

According to a narration, Zakaria ibn Adam said to Ali al-Ridha (the eighth Shia Imam): "I want to leave my family because idiots and ignorant people have increased among them". The Imam said to him: "O Zakaria, do not do this and do not emigrate from Qom, through your existence, God removes the calamity from your family (in another version: from the people of Qom) because of you, just as He removes the calamity from the people of Baghdad because of my father Musa al-Kadhim".

Agent of Muhammad al-Jawad
Zakaria ibn Adam is also considered among the companions of Muhammad al-Jawad (the ninth Shiite Imam). According to the narration of the book Rijal al-Kashshi, he was the agent of the ninth Imam of the Shiites in Qom.

Bibliograghy
Islam scholar's sources attributed a book and a series of issues to Zakaria ibn Adam that have been narrated in different methods. Apparently, this set of issues was Zakaria ibn Adam 's questions from Ali al-Ridha (the eighth Shia Imam):

 Matters from al-Ridha
 Book of Hadith

He has narrated (transmitted) about forty hadiths (with or without intermediaries) from the Imams.

Demise
Some have said that the date of Zakaria ibn Adam 's death was between 819 and 835 CE (between 204 and 220 AH) and at the same time with the birth of Muhammad al-Jawad (the ninth Shia Imam). Others have stated Zakaria ibn Adam passed away during the life of Muhammad al-Jawad and after his death, the Imam wrote about him in a letter:

His grave is located in Qom in Sheikhan cemetery near the Fatima Masumeh Shrine.

See also
 Zakaria ibn Idris Ash'ari Qomi
 Ahmad ibn Ishaq Ash'ari Qomi
 Seyyed Mohammad Hojjat Kooh Kamari
 Mohammad ibn Umar Kashshi
 Mirza-ye Qomi
 Agha Hossein Khansari
 Mohammad Jafar Sabzevari
 Mohaghegh Sabzevari

References

External links
 Picture report: Tomb of Zakaria ibn Adam in the Sheikhan cemetery in Qom
 Revelation and Falsification: The Kitāb al-qirā'āt of Aḥmad b. Muḥammad al ... - Google Books
 Chapter 12: His Companions And Narrators Of His Traditions - The life of Imam ‘Ali Bin Musa al-Ridha’ - Al-Islam.org

8th-century Iranian people
Shia hadith scholars
People from Qom
Shia clerics
Burials at Sheikhan cemetery
9th-century deaths
Year of birth unknown
Year of death unknown